Acanthocnema is a genus of flies belonging to the family Scathophagidae.

The species of this genus are found in Europe and Northern America.

Species:

Acanthocnema albibarba 
Acanthocnema capillata 
Acanthocnema glaucescens 
Acanthocnema himalaica 
Acanthocnema longispina 
Acanthocnema nigrimana 
Acanthocnema ruficauda 
Acanthocnema sternalis

References

Scathophagidae
Muscoidea genera